Vamos juntos is a Mexican telenovela produced by Irene Sabido for Televisa in 1979.

Cast 
Silvia Derbez as Lupe Pistolas
Anita Blanch as Rosa
Macaria as María Elena
Carlos Piñar as Claudio
Enrique Rocha as Juan Cristobal
Paola Jiménez Pons as Susanita
Julieta Bracho as Florencia
Chela Castro as Juana
Cecilia Camacho as Gloria
Rosenda Monteros as Otilia
León Singer as Renato
Milton Rodrigues as Mauro
Rosario Gálvez as Catalina
Luz María Aguilar as Isabel
Roberto "Flaco" Guzmán as Arturo
Tony Carbajal as Pedro
Sofia Yosko as Comentadora

References

External links 

Mexican telenovelas
1979 telenovelas
Televisa telenovelas
Spanish-language telenovelas
1979 Mexican television series debuts
1979 Mexican television series endings